The consumption-based capital asset pricing model (CCAPM) is a model of the determination of expected (i.e. required) return on an investment. The foundations of this concept were laid by the research of Robert Lucas (1978) and Douglas Breeden (1979).

The model is a generalization of the capital asset pricing model (CAPM). While the CAPM is derived in a static, one-period setting, the CCAPM uses a more realistic, multiple-period setup. The central implication of the CCAPM is that the expected return on an asset is related to "consumption risk", that is, how much uncertainty in consumption would come from holding the asset. Assets that lead to a large amount of uncertainty offer large expected returns, as investors want to be compensated for bearing consumption risk.

The CAPM can be derived from the following special cases of the CCAPM: (1) a two-period model with quadratic utility, (2) two-periods, exponential utility, and normally-distributed returns, (3) infinite-periods, quadratic utility, and stochastic independence across time, (4) infinite periods and log utility, and (5) a first-order approximation of a general model with normal distributions.

Formally, the CCAPM states that the expected risk premium on a risky asset, defined as the expected return on a risky asset less the risk free return, is proportional to the covariance of its return and consumption in the period of the return. The consumption beta is included, and the expected return is calculated as follows:

where
 = expected return on security or portfolio
 = risk free rate
  = consumption beta (of individual company or weighted average of portfolio), and
 = return from the market

References

Financial economics
Financial models